Daniel Stankovič (born 11 April 1984) is a Slovenian football player currently playing in FK Famos Vojkovići.

References
 Stats from Slovenia at PrvaLiga.

Living people
1984 births
Slovenian footballers
Slovenian expatriate footballers
NK Rudar Velenje players
FK Slavija Sarajevo players
Expatriate footballers in Bosnia and Herzegovina
Association football forwards